Muhammad Aliff Izwan bin Yuslan (born 10 February 2004) is a Malaysian professional footballer who plays as a forward for the Malaysia Super League club Selangor.

Club career

Early career

Born in Klang, Aliff just recently started his football career with Genpro at the age of 8, and then he joined Mokhtar Dahari Academy youth system in 2015. In November 2020, he joined the Selangor reserve team.

Selangor

Aliff settled quickly into Selangor's youth teams, progressing to the under-23 squad despite still being 17. On 11 March 2022, Aliff made his first-team debut for Selangor as a 61st-minute substitute for Mukhairi Ajmal in a 6–0 home FA Cup win over Harini. After being named as an unused substitute for several Super League matches, Aliff made his first-league debut on 10 April, replacing Caion in the 92nd minute of a 4–1 win against Kedah Darul Aman.

International career

Youth
Aliff has represented Malaysia at under-16 and under-19 levels.

Senior
On 6 December 2022, Aliff was called up to the Malaysia senior team as part of an initial 41-man squad for their 2022 AFF Championship that month, with replacing Faiz Nasir, who was dropped due to health issues. However, he did not made it to the final 23-man squad for the tournament. On 9 December, he made his international debut in a friendly matches against Cambodia replacing Lee Tuck in the 80th minute.

Career statistics

Club

Honours 

Malaysia U16
 AFF U-16 Championship: 2019
Malaysia U19
 AFF U-19 Youth Championship: 2022

References

External links
 

2004 births
Living people
People from Selangor
Malaysian footballers
Association football midfielders
Selangor FA players
Malaysia Super League players